De Pijp  metro station (Dutch: Station De Pijp) is a station on the Route 52 (North–South Line) of the Amsterdam Metro in Amsterdam, Netherlands. It was opened on 22 July 2018. Prior to March 2012, this station was known as the Ceintuurbaan.
De Pijp is an underground station situated in the Oude Pijp neighbourhood of the borough of Amsterdam-Zuid (Amsterdam South). The station is expected to handle around 18,000 passengers and arrivals per day.

History
The station, designed by Benthem Crouwel Architects, is situated beneath the Ferdinand Bolstraat in the De Pijp neighbourhood. Because of the narrow constraints of the site location, between the foundations of adjoining buildings, the station has two levels, with a platform on each level. Each platform is 125 metres long and 5.3 metres wide (3 meters at its narrowest points). There are ten escalators (five per platform) as well as lifts to the mezzanine level. The lower level platform with southbound services to Zuid is 26.5 meters below street level, while the upper level platform with northbound services to Noord is 16.5 meters below street level. This makes De Pijp station the deepest station on the Noord/Zuidlijn and the deepest metro station in the Netherlands.

In May 2013, a municipal advisory committee selected artwork by Argentinian artist Amalia Pica for this station. It is a multicolored painting that will run the entire span of the wall of the mezzanine level.

The station has two entrances, one at Albert Cuypstraat and Ferdinand Bolstraat and one at Ceintuurbaan and Ferdinand Bolstraat. The existing corner buildings at each station entrance location had been demolished. The first designs for the new residential buildings were presented in April 2014.

Gallery

References

External links
GVB website 
Foto's van Station De Pijp in de Beeldbank van het Stadsarchief Amsterdam 
North-South Line project site 

Amsterdam Metro stations